Petro Platonovich Udovychenko (February 17, 1914 in Poltava region – May 29, 1992 in Kyiv) he was Ukrainian politician, diplomat, Ph.D. Candidate of science in History, Professor, Academician of the National Academy of Pedagogical Sciences of Ukraine, Ambassador Extraordinary and Plenipotentiary, Permanent Representative of Ukraine to the United Nations, Minister of Education of the Ukrainian SSR.

Education 
Petro Udovychenko graduated from the Pedagogical Institute of Novomoskovsk (1934), Faculty of History; Higher Party School of the Central Committee (1944); Ph.D. (1947).

Professional career and experience 

In 1934 - 1939 - he worked as a teacher at the school Dnipropetrovsk

In 1939 - 1941 - he was Director Tarnopolsky Teachers College

Since 1941 - he worked on the state and party work

Since 1944 - he worked in the Commissariat of Foreign Affairs of the Ukrainian SSR.

Since 1947 - he lectured at Taras Shevchenko National University of Kyiv.

From 1948 to 1952 - Deputy Minister of Foreign Affairs of the Ukrainian SSR.

From 1952 to 1956 - Associate Professor of International Relations and Foreign Policy of the Ukrainian SSR.

From 1956 to 1958 - he worked as a Vice-Rector for Academic Taras Shevchenko National University of Kyiv.

From 24 March 1958 to 1961 - he was permanent representative of the Ukrainian Soviet Socialist Republic to the United Nations.

From 1961 to 1967 - he headed of Department of International Relations and Foreign Policy of the Taras Shevchenko National University of Kyiv.

In 1967 - 1971 - Minister of Education of the Ukrainian SSR.

From 1971 to 1984 - he was Acting professor of the history of international relations and foreign policy of the Taras Shevchenko National University of Kyiv.

Author 
 "History of Ukrainian SSR Foreign Policy 1919-1922" (1957).

Diplomatic rank 
 Ambassador Extraordinary and Plenipotentiary

References

External links 
 Handbook of the history of the Communist Party and the Soviet Union 1898 - 1991
 UNITED NATIONS SECURITY COUNCIL OFFICIAL RECORDS THIRTY-NINTH YEAR 2542nd MEETING: 25 MAY 1984 NEW YORK
 Diplomacy in the Former Soviet Republics James P. Nichol Greenwood Publishing Group, 1.01.1995 - 244.
 Ukraine's U.N. Mission celebrates 40th anniversary
 Гай-Нижник П. Удовиченко Петро Платонович // Тернопільський Енциклопедичний Словник. – Тернопіль: ВАТ ТВПК “Збруч”, 2009. – Т.4 (додатковий). А–Я. – С.644.

1914 births
1992 deaths
People from Poltava Oblast
People from Poltava Governorate
Permanent Representatives of Ukraine to the United Nations
20th-century Ukrainian historians
Education ministers of the Ukrainian Soviet Socialist Republic
Communist Party of Ukraine (Soviet Union) politicians